The historiographical term "Eighteen Kingdoms", also translated as "Eighteen States", refers to the eighteen fengjian states in China created by military leader Xiang Yu in 206 BCE, after the collapse of the Qin dynasty. The establishment and abolishment of the Eighteen Kingdoms marked the beginning and end of a turbulent interregnum known as the Chu–Han Contention.

The details of the feudal division are as follows:

The Eighteen Kingdoms were short-lived. Almost immediately rebellion broke out in Qi, after which Tian Rong conquered Jiaodong and Jibei, reuniting the old Qi state. Meanwhile, Xiang Yu had Emperor Yi of Chu and King Han Cheng of Hán killed. Thereafter, Liu Bang of Hàn conquered the lands of the Three Qins, thereby formally starting the Chu–Han Contention. Following many battles and changing alliances, Hàn defeated Chu and subdued all other kingdoms, where Liu Bang appointed vassal kings while making himself the first Emperor of the Han dynasty in 202 BCE.

See also
 Fengjian
 Ancient Chinese states
 Kings of the Han dynasty

Notes

References

Qin dynasty
Han dynasty
Dynasties in Chinese history
Former countries in Chinese history